Milestone Hotel is a heritage-listed Australian pub at 195-197 Macquarie Street, Dubbo, Dubbo Regional Council, New South Wales, Australia. It was built in 1882. It is also known as the Imperial Hotel; The Bushman's Home; and Kemwah Court. The property is owned by a private entity. It was added to the New South Wales State Heritage Register on 2 April 1999.

History 
Built in 1882 at the south end of Macquarie Street, just when the town's northward shift began.

In 2018, the building continues in use as the Milestone Hotel.

Description 
The site is on the south-western corner of the intersection of Macquarie and Bultje Streets. The hotel building occupies the eastern portion of the site with a customer and staff car park to the rear. A deciduous tree is immediately outside the Macquarie Street facade near the corner.

The hotel is a freestanding one and two-storey late Victorian Italianate style hotel, made of brick, painted, with a hipped roof clad in corrugated steel. A single storey verandah roof extends over the footpath on the Macquarie Street elevation and partly along the north side on Bultje Street. Windows and doors are timber-framed and of recent construction. The building is significant as a good example of a late 19th century Victorian Italianate style hotel.

Heritage listing 
Kemwah Court was listed on the New South Wales State Heritage Register on 2 April 1999.

See also

References

Bibliography

Attribution 

New South Wales State Heritage Register
Dubbo
Pubs in New South Wales
Articles incorporating text from the New South Wales State Heritage Register
1882 establishments in Australia